Speaking in Tongues is an album by David Murray. It was released on the Canadian Justin Time label. Recorded in 1997 and released in 1999, the album contains performances by Murray with Fontella Bass, Leopoldo F. Fleming, Stanley Franks, Clarence 'Pookie' Jenkins, Ranzell Merritt, Jimane Nelson, and Hugh Ragin.

Reception
The AllMusic review by Heather Phares stated: "Speaking in Tongues features more intuitive, forward-thinking work from this challenging saxophonist and his band." Mother Jones deemed the album "spirituals ... interpreted with a heavy dose of electrified soul."

Track listing
 "How I Got Over" (Ward) – 5:39  
 "Nobody Knows the Trouble I've Seen" (Traditional) – 9:33  
 "Jimane's Creation" (Nelson) – 6:29  
 "Missionary" (Murray) – 11:43  
 "Don't Know What I Would Do" (Traditional) – 8:44  
 "Amazing Grace" (Newton) – 5:53  
 "Blessed Assurance" (Traditional) – 4:31  
 "A Closer Walk With Thee" (Traditional) – 4:22  
Recorded December 5, 1997

Personnel
David Murray – tenor saxophone, bass clarinet
Fontella Bass – vocals
Leopoldo F. Fleming – percussion
Stanley Franks – guitar
Clarence 'Pookie' Jenkins – electric bass
Ranzell Merritt – drums
Jimane Nelson – organ, piano, synthesizers
Hugh Ragin – trumpet

References

1999 albums
David Murray (saxophonist) albums
Justin Time Records albums